The Elegant Universe: Superstrings, Hidden Dimensions, and the Quest for the Ultimate Theory is a book by Brian Greene published in 1999, which introduces string and superstring theory, and provides a comprehensive though non-technical assessment of the theory and some of its shortcomings. In 2000, it won the Royal Society Prize for Science Books and was a finalist for the Pulitzer Prize for General Non-Fiction. A new edition was released in 2003, with an updated preface.

Table of contents
 Preface (with an additional preface to the 2003 edition)
 Part I: The Edge of Knowledge
 Part II: The Dilemma of Space, Time, and the Quanta
 Part III: The Cosmic Symphony
 Part IV: String Theory and the Fabric of Spacetime
 Part V: Unification in the Twenty-First Century

Contents
Beginning with a brief consideration of classical physics, which concentrates on the major conflicts in physics, Greene establishes a historical context for string theory as a necessary means of integrating the probabilistic world of the standard model of particle physics and the deterministic Newtonian physics of the macroscopic world. Greene discusses the essential problem facing modern physics: the unification of Albert Einstein's theory of General Relativity and Quantum Mechanics. Greene suggests that string theory is the solution to these two conflicting approaches. Greene frequently uses analogies and thought experiments to provide a means for the layman to come to terms with the theory which has the potential to create a unified theory of physics.

Reception
According to George Johson's review in The New York Times:

John H. Schwarz wrote:

Adaptations
The Elegant Universe was adapted into an Emmy Award-winning three-hour program in three parts for television broadcast in late 2003 on the PBS series NOVA.

 Einstein's Dream
 String's The Thing
 Welcome To The 11th Dimension

The Elegant Universe was also interpreted by choreographer Karole Armitage, of Armitage Gone! Dance, in New York City. A performance of the work-in-progress formed part of the inaugural World Science Festival.

See also 
 The Fabric of the Cosmos
 The Science of Interstellar
 Quantum mechanics

Footnotes

References
Brian Greene, "The Elegant Universe: Superstrings, Hidden Dimensions, and the Quest for the Ultimate Theory", Vintage Series, Random House Inc., February 2000

External links

 "Science & the City" podcast of Armitage's adaptation, produced by the New York Academy of Sciences
 
 
 

1999 non-fiction books
2003 American television episodes
Books by Brian Greene
Nova (American TV program) episodes
Popular physics books
String theory books
Cosmology books
W. W. Norton & Company books